Mechanicsville is an unincorporated community and census-designated place in St. Mary's County, Maryland, United States. It is adjacent to the community of Charlotte Hall, which is known for its agriculture, Amish population, large farmers' market/flea market and the Maryland Veterans Home. Mechanicsville has many small businesses and restaurants along Maryland Route 5 and Maryland Route 235. The community is served by the St. Mary's County Public Schools, including Chopticon High School. At the 2010 census, Mechanicsville had a population of 1,528.

The Amish community in the Mechanicsville area consists of eight church districts and approximately 1,000 people. The Amish first came to the area in 1940. There is also an Old Order Mennonite community in the Mechanisville area. In recent years, increasing development has threatened the Amish community.

History
Part of the area was first settled in the 1660s by early Maryland colonists who were tobacco planters. They established some farms not far from the Patuxent river. In 1819, Cremona Farm, a 750-acre estate and plantation was built in the same location. In about 1850, "Mechanicsville Village" was established on the historic Three Notch Trail. The name "Mechanicsville" is believed to have come from the word "Mechanic" because the area became a center for blacksmiths and other craftsmen. In those days "Mechanic" meant a skilled tradesperson who worked by hands.

There was an old railway that passed through Mechanicsville and local residents joined other St. Mary's County residents in purchasing it and saving it from being scrapped in 1918. Farm goods moved along the railroad on train cars and passenger service continued until about 1928. By that time county roads had improved and the railway began to fall out of use.

The Amish community was established in Mechanicsville in 1940. It is a Lancaster County, Pennsylvania, daughter settlement.
The Amish left Lancaster County because of a dispute with the state of Pennsylvania over education practices. The Amish people had their own system of one room schoolhouses there and a school year that better accommodated the farm season. But Pennsylvania tried to force them into the state school system. Maryland provided a place for the Lancaster Amish to escape these pressures and, as historian Karen Johnson-Weiner described, avoid “what they saw as a threat to their religious identity”.
Many Amish left at the time and one large group moved to Mechanicsville, Maryland. Today, the Amish settlement in Mechanicsville is one of the largest Lancaster daughter communities.

Demographics

2020 US federal census
In 2020, the population of Mechanicsville was 1,673 in 628 households.

Population by race
 White alone: 1,433
 Two or More Races: 111
 Black or African American: 98
 Hispanic or Latino: 58
 Asian: 12
 American Indian (Native American): 9
 Other race: 9

Ethnic heritageIrish 33.3%, German 32.4%, French (except Basque) 16.6%, English 13.9%, Polish 9.5%, African-American 5.9%, Italian 5.4%, Scottish 1.5%, Norwegian 0.8%, American Indian 0.5%.

Income and education
 Median household income: $99,041
 High school or equivalent degree: 40.9%
 Some college, no degree: 10.7%
 Associate degree: 2.7%
 Bachelor's degree: 20.5%
 Graduate or professional degree: 11.4%
 Bachelor's Degree or higher: 31.9%

Notable people
Jerome Adams, former Surgeon General of the United States and former Indiana state health commissioner.
Henry J. Fowler, businessman and member of the Maryland House of Delegates
Rep. Steny Hoyer member of the Democratic Party who was the House Majority Leader and was also the House Minority Whip of the House of Representatives.
Daryl Thompson, Major League Baseball pitcher and a 2003 graduate of La Plata High School
 Norton Dodge, owner and longtime resident of Cremona Farm, economist, collector of Soviet era art, smuggled thousands of Soviet dissident paintings, prints and sculptures out of communist Russia, amassing one of the largest collections of Soviet-era art outside of the Soviet Union. He secretly stored them at his farm in Mechanicsville.

Climate
The climate in this area is characterized by hot, humid summers and generally cool to cold winters.  According to the Köppen Climate Classification system, Mechanicsville has a humid subtropical climate, abbreviated "Cfa" on climate maps. In the spring and summer the area gets frequent thunderstorms, many severe, and on rare occasion, tornadoes. From June 2021 to June 2022 Mechanicsville had 41 severe thunderstorm warnings.

2022 Tornado
On June 8, 2022, a severe thunderstorm developed a tornado that touched down in Mechanicsville, damaging farm buildings and a residential home, uprooting some trees and snapping other tree trunks.

Monthly weather averages

References

External links
 Village of Mechanicsville: Three Notch Trail, Historic Marker Databse article
 The Amish of Mechanicsville, Maryland, Amish America article
 The St. Mary's County Black History Coalition, a nonprofit organization headquartered in Mechanicsville, Maryland

Amish in Maryland
Census-designated places in St. Mary's County, Maryland
Census-designated places in Maryland
Mennonitism in Maryland
Pennsylvania Dutch culture in Maryland
Old Order Mennonites

de:St. Mary's County